The Palestinian Hydrology Group (PHG) is a Palestinian NGO focusing on water and sanitation issues. It monitors, analyzes and reports on the changing state of water quality, sanitation and water access, pollution and infrastructure.

Organization
The Palestinian Hydrology Group has offices in Gaza, Hebron, Jerusalem, Nablus, and Ramallah.

Partners
 Oxfam 
 Care

References

External links
 Official website

 Brown U.: Environmental damage from Israeli forces is severe, activist says
Palestinian territories: the Director of the Palestinian Hydrology Group for Water and Environmental Resources Development, Abdel Rahman Tamimi, reported on 16 August 2004 that the controversial wall being built by Israel is positioned to take control over the Western Aquifer, which supplies irrigation water for Palestinian farmers in the northern areas of the West Bank
Palestine is Still the Land of Hilk and Honey: Farmers Fight to Get Wines, Dates, Nuts, Tomatoes Out to the World
Peace Activists Supply Water to South Hebron Hills

Organizations based in the State of Palestine
Organizations established in 1987